General elections were held in Greenland on 4 March 1995. Siumut remained the largest party in the Parliament, winning 12 of the 31 seats.

Results

References

Elections in Greenland
Greenland
1995 in Greenland